"Bouquet of Roses" is a 1948 song written by Steve Nelson (music) and Bob Hilliard (lyrics). It was originally recorded by Eddy Arnold and his Tennessee Plow Boys and his Guitar in Chicago on May 18, 1947. It was released by RCA Victor as catalogue number 20-2806 (in USA) and by EMI on the His Master's Voice label as catalogue numbers BD 1234 and IM 1399. "Bouquet of Roses" was Eddy Arnold's third number one in a row on the Juke Box Folk Record chart and spent 19 weeks on the Best Selling Folk Records chart. In 1949, when RCA Victor introduced its new 45 RPM single format this record was among  seven initial releases (Catalog #48-0001) and the first in the Country and Western category.
Arnold would re-record "Bouquet of Roses" several times during his career.

The song spent 54 weeks on the country music charts, accounting for the longest amount of time spent on that chart. The record held until September 2010, when it was broken by Lee Brice's "Love Like Crazy."

Chart performance

Cover versions
1948 Dick Haymes
1949, Netherlandish singer Eddy Christiani recorded a still popular Netherlandish translation/interpretation of the song Bouquetje Rode Rozen that has been attributed to other Netherlandish songwriters. Because of the moment of release these Netherlandish claims are obviously fraudulent.
1957 Marty Robbins in the album The Song of Robbins.
1958 Margaret Whiting recorded for her album Margaret.
1960 Bill Haley & His Comets included the song on the album Haley's Juke Box
1962 Les Paul and Mary Ford included in their album Bouquet of Roses.
1963 Al Martino for his album I Love You Because.
1963 Clint Eastwood included in the album Rawhide's Clint Eastwood Sings Cowboy Favorites.
1963 Dean Martin in the album Dean "Tex" Martin Rides Again.
1963 The Mills Brothers recorded for their album The End of the World.
1964 The Andrews Sisters for their album Great Country Hits
1964 Slim Whitman for his album Country Songs / City Hits
1965 Bing Crosby included the song in his album Bing Crosby Sings the Great Country Hits.
1965 Vic Damone for the album Country Love Songs.
1967 Bobby Vinton for his album Please Love Me Forever
1975, Mickey Gilley recorded the song which peaked at number eleven on the country chart.

References

Songs about flowers
1948 songs
1975 singles
Eddy Arnold songs
Billboard Hot Country Songs number-one singles of the year
Mickey Gilley songs
Songs with lyrics by Bob Hilliard
RCA Records singles
Playboy Records singles
Songs written by Steve Nelson (songwriter)